Abdulkarim Abdulnabi (born 24 May 1987) is a Bahraini tennis player.

Abdulnabi represents Bahrain at the Davis Cup, where he has a W/L record of 18–20.

References

External links

1987 births
Living people
Bahraini male tennis players